Big Band Jazz from the Summit is a live album by American jazz drummer Louis Bellson featuring performances recorded in Los Angeles in 1962 for the Roulette label.

Reception

AllMusic awarded the album 3 stars.

Track listing
All compositions by Benny Carter except as indicated
 "Who's Who" - 2:24
 "Cool" (Leonard Bernstein) - 4:46
 "Amoroso" - 3:29
 "Prelude" (George Williams) - 3:22
 "Gumshoe" - 4:05
 "Blitzen" (Leonard Feather) - 3:04
 "St. Louie" (Marty Paich) - 2:29
 "The Moon Is Low" (Arthur Freed, Nacio Herb Brown) – 3:24
 "Doozy" - 3:04
 "Lou’s Blues" - 3:40
 "With Bells On" (Shorty Rogers) - 3:22
 "The Diplomat Speaks" (Louis Bellson) - 4:35
Recorded live at The Summit, 6507 Sunset Blvd. Hollywood, CA on January 22 (tracks 1, 3, 4, 8 & 12), January 23 (tracks 5, 6 & 9) and January 24 (tracks 2, 7, 10 & 11), 1962

Personnel 
Louis Bellson – drums
John Audino, Conte Candoli, Frank Huggins, Al Porcino (tracks 2, 7, 10 & 11), Uan Rasey (tracks 5, 6 & 9), Ray Triscari (tracks 1, 3, 4 & 8), Jimmy Zito - trumpet
Arthur Maebe - French horn
Nick Di Maio, Mike Barone - trombones
Ernie Tack - bass trombone
Red Callender - tuba
Joe Maini, Willie Green - alto saxophone
Bill Perkins, Carrington Visor - tenor saxophone
Teddy Lee - baritone saxophone
Gene Estes - vibraphone, boobam
Tony Rizzi - guitar
Lou Levy - piano
Jimmy Bond - bass
Benny Carter (tracks 1, 3, 5, 6, 8, 9 & 10), Bob Florence (track 12), Marty Paich (tracks 2 & 7), Shorty Rogers (track 11) and George Williams (track 4) - arranger

References

Louie Bellson live albums
1962 live albums
Albums produced by Teddy Reig
Roulette Records live albums